The 2003–04 season was Getafe CF's 21st season in existence as a football club. In addition to the domestic league, the club also competed in the Copa del Rey.

Pre-season and friendlies

Competitions

Overall record

Segunda División

League table

Results summary

Results by round

Matches

Copa del Rey

Statistics

Goalscorers

References

Getafe CF seasons
Getafe